James E. Rainey (born 1964 or 1965) is a United States Army general who serves as the commanding general of United States Army Futures Command since 4 October 2022. He previously served as Deputy Chief of Staff for Operations, Plans, and Training (G-3/5/7) from June 2021 to October 2022. Before that, he served as commanding general of the United States Army Combined Arms Center, commandant of the United States Army Command and General Staff College and commanding general of Fort Leavenworth. Prior to that, he commanded the Combined Security Transition Command – Afghanistan. Rainey was born in Brockton, Massachusetts but grew up in Akron, Ohio. He attended Eastern Kentucky University and was commissioned in 1987 as an infantry officer through ROTC.

On 6 September 2022, Rainey was nominated for promotion to general and assignment as commanding general of the United States Army Futures Command. His nomination was confirmed by voice vote of the Senate on 29 September 2022.

Awards and decorations

References

Living people
Place of birth missing (living people)
Recipients of the Defense Distinguished Service Medal
Recipients of the Distinguished Service Medal (US Army)
Recipients of the Legion of Merit
United States Army generals
United States Army personnel of the Iraq War
United States Army personnel of the War in Afghanistan (2001–2021)
Year of birth missing (living people)
Commandants of the United States Army Command and General Staff College